Lukovo may refer to:

 Lukovo, Bulgaria, a village in Bulgaria
 Lukovo, Croatia, a village near Vrbovec, Croatia
 Lukovo, Nikšić, Montenegro
 Lukovo, Struga, a village near Struga, North Macedonia
 Lukovo (Boljevac), a village in Serbia
 Lukovo (Kuršumlija), a village and spa in Serbia
 Lukovo (Raška), a village in Serbia
 Lukovo (Svrljig), a village in Serbia
 Lukovo (Vranje), a village in Serbia